Megachile albohirta is a species of bee in the family Megachilidae. It was described by Brullé in 1839.

References

Albohirta
Insects described in 1839
Taxa named by Gaspard Auguste Brullé